Not Just Another Bunch of Pretty Faces is the seventh studio album by British jazz-rock band If, released in 1974. 

The band was now back on Capitol Records for U.S. distribution.

Track listing

Side one 
 "In the Winter of Your Life" – 4:59
 "Stormy Every Weekday Blues" – 6:07  	
 "Follow That with Your Performing Seals" – 5:51

Side two 
 "Still Alive" – 4:29
 "Borrowed Time" – 4:30
 "Chiswick High Road Blues" – 5:17
 "I Believe in Rock & Roll" – 4:53

Personnel
 Dick Morrissey – saxes and flute, lead vocals (4)
 Geoff Whitehorn – electric and acoustic guitars, lead (1, 7) and backing vocals
 Gabriel Magno – Hammond organ, electric and acoustic pianos, electric harpsichord
 Walt Monaghan – bass (all but 1), lead (5, 7) and backing vocals
 Cliff Davies – drums, lead vocals (2, 6), congas, vibes
 Mike Tomich – bass (1)

References 

1974 albums
If (band) albums